Jaheim Oatis is an American football defensive tackle for the Alabama Crimson Tide.

Career
Otis attended Columbia High School in Columbia, Mississippi. He was selected to play in the 2022 Under Armour All-America Game. Oatis started receiving college football scholarship offers when he was in seventh grade. While in high school, he committed to the University of Alabama to play college football.

Oatis lost nearly 75 pounds prior to his true freshman year at Alabama in 2022. In his first year at Alabama he earned a starting job.

References

External links
Alabama Crimson Tide bio

Living people
Players of American football from Mississippi
American football defensive tackles
Alabama Crimson Tide football players
Year of birth missing (living people)